Ernest Papa Arko (born 12 May 1984) is a Ghanaian football striker who currently plays for the Ghana Premier League side Liberty Professionals.

Career
Arko used to play for Ocean Stars in Medina and was spotted by Sly Tetteh. He moved to play for Liberty Professionals and was offloaded  to El Geish (aka |Army Stars). He was the leading striker of El Geish. From there, the loan was transferred into a permanent sale. He went on to become the leading scorer for Egyptian League.

International career
He scored in his debut on 1 June 2009 against Uganda national football team and scores in his debut his first goal, formerly played for the U-17 & U-20 team.

International goals
Scores and results list Ghana's goal tally first.

References

1984 births
Living people
Ghanaian footballers
Association football forwards
Expatriate footballers in Egypt
Ghanaian expatriate sportspeople in Egypt
Expatriate footballers in Qatar
Qatar Stars League players
Liberty Professionals F.C. players
Tala'ea El Gaish SC players
Al-Arabi SC (Qatar) players
Smouha SC players
El Entag El Harby SC players
Ghana international footballers
Egyptian Premier League players